The Lake Tahoe Shakespeare Festival (LTSF) is a Not-For-Profit Nevada community-based arts enrichment program that produces classical and contemporary stage productions.

History 
The Lake Tahoe Shakespeare Festival began in 1972 at Sugar Pine Point State Park on the west shore of Lake Tahoe. During its run from 1972-1974, productions were performed on the lawn in front of the Ehrman Mansion until maintenance issues made the venue unsuitable. 

Under the auspices of the North Tahoe Fine Arts Council (NTFAC), performances were moved to Skylandia Park in Tahoe City, until attendance growth surpassed capacity. In 1978, NTFAC and Nevada State Parks agreed to move the venue to Lake Tahoe Nevada State Parks Sand Harbor, and performances resumed in 1979.

NTFAC produced and managed Shakespeare at Sand Harbor, nicknamed “Bard on the Beach”, and by 1988 the repertory schedule had increased to 15 nights and often included non-Shakespearean works. 

In 1994, the Incline Village Crystal Bay Visitors Bureau took over the management and production of performances at Sand Harbor. The following year the Lake Tahoe Shakespeare Festival was incorporated as an independent not-for-profit organization.

In May of 1999, the not-for-profit Parasol Tahoe Community Foundation, invited the Lake Tahoe Shakespeare Festival to share space in the Donald W. Reynolds Not-For-Profit Center, a center designed for the needs of not-for-profit and volunteer organizations in the North Lake Tahoe region. At a cost of nearly two million dollars, a state-of-the-art amphitheater called "Warren Edward Trepp Stage" was constructed and then was dedicated in the year 2000.

Educational outreach program 
The Lake Tahoe Shakespeare Festival also produces the “D.G. Menchetti Young Shakespeare Programs,” which is educational programming named to honor the legacy of founding Board member, Geno Menchetti.  These programs reach over 8,500 young people each year in the Tahoe region. In the summer, the festival presents “Young Shakespeare”, an interactive adaptation for children of a Shakespeare play performed at Sand Harbor as well as other locations around Lake Tahoe. During the academic school year, the festival provides an in-school residency in Shakespeare and the classics, “InterACT,” to schools throughout the region.

Other performances 
The Lake Tahoe Shakespeare Festival has included performances by the Reno Philharmonic Orchestra, Chautauqua, Reno Jazz Orchestra, Pacific Mambo Orchestra and the Sierra Nevada Ballet.

References

External links 
Official site

Lake Tahoe
Shakespeare festivals in the United States
Festivals in Nevada